Many synthetic cannabinoids were designed by Pfizer in the 1970s and 1980s, and feature an alphanumeric code beginning with the prefix "CP" (after Charles Pfizer). Recently, several members of this class of cannabinoids have been discovered in recreational drug products.

 CP 47,497 —
 (C6)-CP 47,497 —
 (C7)-CP 47,497 (CP 47,497 itself) —
 (C8)-CP 47,497 (Cannabicyclohexanol) —
 (C9)-CP 47,497 —
 CP 50,556-1 (Levonantradol) —
 CP 55,244 —
 CP 55,940 —
 (±)-CP 55,940 — (±)-CP 55,940 is a widely used cannabinoid research tool.
 (+)-CP 55,940 —
 (-)-CP 55,940 —
 CP-945,598 (Otenabant) —

See also
 List of AM cannabinoids
 List of HU cannabinoids
 List of JWH cannabinoids
 List of miscellaneous designer cannabinoids

References

Cannabinoids
Chemistry-related lists